Elizabeth Williams  (née Larby, formerly Emily May; 29 January 1895 – 29 March 1986) was a British mathematician and educationist.

Life 
Williams was born on 29 January 1895 in Pimlico, London. She studied in Chelsea and Forest Gate during her childhood, and at the age of 16 began attending Bedford College, University of London for a college degree.
At Bedford, one of her mentors was Alfred North Whitehead. She became a grammar school teacher, but had to stop teaching when she became married in 1922.
Because of this situation, she founded her own school in North London with her husband, and then in 1930 (with the assistance of Percy Nunn, who had been a former tutor) she took a position in education at King's College London.

She became a Commander of the Order of the British Empire in 1958, and president of the Mathematical Association for 1965–1966.

Works 
 Oxford Junior Mathematics: Teacher's, Book 5 (1966)

References 

1895 births
1986 deaths
20th-century English educators
English educational theorists
British women mathematicians
Alumni of Bedford College, London
Academics of King's College London
20th-century British mathematicians
Commanders of the Order of the British Empire
20th-century women mathematicians